Brunswick SC may refer to:

Brunswick SC (1921–1936), a defunct Association football (soccer) club based in Brunswick, Victoria
Brunswick City SC, an Association football (soccer) club based in Brunswick West, Victoria
Brunswick Juventus Junior FC, an Association football (soccer) club based in Brunswick East, Victoria
Brunswick Latvia FC, an defunct Association football (soccer) club based in Parkville, Victoria
Moreland Zebras Juventus FC, an Association football (soccer) club based in Fawkner, Victoria